Wilin Arismendy Rosario Hernández (born February 23, 1989) is a Dominican professional baseball catcher and first baseman who is a free agent. He has played in Major League Baseball (MLB) for the Colorado Rockies, the KBO League for the Hanwha Eagles, Nippon Professional Baseball (NPB) for the Hanshin Tigers, and the Chinese Professional Baseball League (CPBL) for the Uni-President Lions.

Career

Colorado Rockies
On September 6, 2011, Rosario made his MLB debut. He batted 0-for-3 with a walk and a run scored, as his Rockies defeated the Arizona Diamondbacks, 8–3. Rosario appeared in a total of 16 games for the Rockies that season. He posted a .204 batting average, hit 3 home runs and totalled 8 RBI.

During the 2012 season, Rosario saw action in 117 games with the Rockies. He finished 4th in the 2012 NL Rookie of the year voting, after hitting .270 with 28 home runs and 71 RBI. Rosario topped all MLB catchers in home runs with 28 in 2012.

In 2013, Rosario set career highs in games played (121), batting average (.292), RBIs (79) and hits (131). In 2014, Rosario experienced a dropoff in production, regressing in power and in average despite striking out less. His defense behind the plate did not improve as well, leading the majors for the third straight season in pass balls.

With the addition of Nick Hundley in the 2015 season, the Rockies moved Rosario to first base full-time, only playing catcher in case of a game emergency. For the 2015 season, Rosario's role on the team was part-time first baseman and pinch hitter, appearing only in 87 games for the Rockies. Rosario was designated for assignment by the Rockies after the 2015 season.

Hanwha Eagles
Rosario signed with the Hanwha Eagles of the Korea Baseball Organization for the 2016 season. In two seasons with the Eagles, Rosario hit .330 with 70 home runs and 231 runs batted in.

Hanshin Tigers
On December 14, 2017, Rosario signed with the Hanshin Tigers of Nippon Professional Baseball (NPB).

Minnesota Twins
On February 1, 2019, Rosario signed a minor league contract with the Minnesota Twins. He opened the 2019 season with the Rochester Red Wings. He became a free agent following the 2019 season.

Pericos de Puebla
On January 16, 2020, Rosario signed with the Pericos de Puebla of the Mexican League. Rosario did not play in a game in 2020 due to the cancellation of the Mexican League season because of the COVID-19 pandemic. In 31 games, Rosario slashed .319/.369/.521 with 5 home runs and 17 RBI before he was released by Puebla on July 13, 2021.

Uni-President Lions
On January 6, 2022, Rosario signed with the Uni-President Lions of the Chinese Professional Baseball League for the 2022 season. He only played in 5 games before he suffered a leg injury on April 8. Rosario was released by the team on June 2, 2022.

Mariachis de Guadalajara
On July 5, 2022, Rosario signed with the Mariachis de Guadalajara of the Mexican League. Rosario appeared in 27 games for Guadalajara, hitting a robust .413/.481/.641 with 5 home runs and 29 RBI.

On February 15, 2023, Rosario was released by the Mariachis.

References

External links

Career statistics and player information from the KBO League

1989 births
Living people
Águilas Cibaeñas players
Casper Ghosts players
Casper Rockies players
Colorado Rockies players
Colorado Springs Sky Sox players
Dominican Summer League Rockies players
Dominican Republic expatriate baseball players in Japan
Dominican Republic expatriate baseball players in Mexico
Dominican Republic expatriate baseball players in South Korea
Dominican Republic expatriate baseball players in Taiwan
Dominican Republic expatriate baseball players in the United States
Hanshin Tigers players
Hanwha Eagles players
KBO League designated hitters
Major League Baseball players from the Dominican Republic
Major League Baseball catchers
Major League Baseball first basemen
Mariachis de Guadalajara players
Modesto Nuts players
Nippon Professional Baseball first basemen
People from Bonao
Pericos de Puebla players
Scottsdale Scorpions players
Tulsa Drillers players
Uni-President Lions players
Rochester Red Wings players